Verulam is a township just north of Barberton in the Mpumalanga province of South Africa. It is situated in the De Kaap Valley and is fringed by the Makhonjwa Mountains.

References 

Populated places in the Mbombela Local Municipality